The term Tsallis statistics usually refers to the collection of mathematical functions and associated probability distributions that were originated by Constantino Tsallis. Using that collection, it is possible to derive Tsallis distributions from the optimization of the Tsallis entropic form. A continuous real parameter q can be used to adjust the distributions, so that distributions which have properties intermediate to that of Gaussian and Lévy distributions can be created. The parameter q represents the degree of non-extensivity of the distribution. Tsallis statistics are useful for characterising complex, anomalous diffusion.

Tsallis functions
The q-deformed exponential and logarithmic functions were first introduced in Tsallis statistics in 1994.

q-exponential
The q-exponential is a deformation of the exponential function using the real parameter q.

Note that the q-exponential in Tsallis statistics is different from a version used elsewhere.

q-logarithm
The q-logarithm is the inverse of q-exponential and a deformation of the logarithm using the real parameter q.

Inverses 
These functions have the property that

Analysis 
The  limits of the above expression can be understood by considering

for the exponential function and

for the logarithm.

See also 
 Tsallis entropy
 Tsallis distribution
 q-Gaussian
 q-exponential distribution
 q-Weibull distribution

References

 S. Abe, A.K. Rajagopal (2003). Letters, Science (11 April 2003), Vol. 300, issue 5617, 249–251. 
 S. Abe, Y. Okamoto, Eds. (2001) Nonextensive Statistical Mechanics and its Applications. Springer-Verlag. 
 G. Kaniadakis, M. Lissia, A. Rapisarda, Eds. (2002) "Special Issue on Nonextensive Thermodynamics and Physical Applications." Physica A 305, 1/2.

External links
Tsallis statistics on arxiv.org

Statistical mechanics